The Dorand AR.1 was a World War I French two-seat observation biplane aircraft used by the French Air Force, the American Expeditionary Force and, in small numbers, by Serbian Aviation.

Design and development
Designed by Captain Georges Lepère of the STAé to replace the obsolescent Farman F.40 pusher aircraft, Dorand AR-series were two-seater reconnaissance biplanes that were named after the STAé director, Lt. Col. Dorand.  They were characterized by backward-staggered two-bay wings and angular all-moving tail surfaces.  The pilot sat beneath the leading edge of the upper wing, with the observer's cockpit being under the trailing edge, and there were cut-outs in both wings to improve the latter's field of view.  Rather unusually for a single-engine tractor biplane of the era, the lower wing was not directly attached to the fuselage, instead being somewhat below it, supported by struts.

Production of these aircraft began in a state-owned French Army Aircraft Establishment (or S.T.Aé.) factory at Chalais-Meudon, near Paris, after flight testing had been completed in the autumn 1916.

Operational history 

The first of the thirteen squadrons which flew Dorands on the Western Front received their aircraft in the spring 1917.  Five other French squadrons used the type on the Italian Front.  These aircraft were withdrawn from the combat units in early 1918.

In 1917 the American Expeditionary Force ordered the Renault-engined varieties of the Dorand, the first of 22 AR.1s being delivered in December 1917 and the first of 120 AR.2s in following February.  The Americans operated these types on the Western Front for the first half 1918, until replacing them with the Salmson 2.  After being retired from fighting duties, the surviving examples were used as trainers.

A small number of Dorand AR.1s were also supplied to Kingdom of Serbia, which operated these aircraft in four squadrons from April 1918 onwards. While the Dorand AR-types didn't have a particularly distinguished career in either French or American service, having a rather mediocre performance for a late-war daytime reconnaissance aircraft and suffering from having low priority for engine supplies, it is a testimony to the general soundness of the design that after the war, many AR.1s and AR.2s appeared in the French civil register, being used as 2/3-passenger transports by companies like Compagnie Aérienne Française and Réseau Aérien Transafricain.  Private users found the aircraft useful for training and joy-flights as well.

Variants

There were following variants of the design:

AR.1 A2 160  Early production version powered by a   Renault 8Gd engine
AR.1 A2 200 Mid production version powered by a  Renault 8Gdy engine
AR.1 A2 190 Late production version powered by a  Renault 8Gd engine
ARL.1 A2 AR.1s modified with a  Lorraine-Dietrich engine
AR.1 D2Trainers powered by Renault 12d air-cooled V-12s.
AR.2 A2  2nd production version powered by a  Renault 8Ge engine
ARL.2 A2 AR.2s modified with a  Lorraine-Dietrich engine

All these types had "A.2" added to their names in French service, indicating that they were two-seater reconnaissance aircraft.

Operators

 Aéronautique Militaire

 Hellenic Air Force

 Operated a single example.

 Serbian Air Force

 American Expeditionary Force

Specifications (AR.1)

See also

References 

 Munson, Kenneth - Bombers, Patrol and Reconnaissance Aircraft 1914 - 1919 
 Owers, Colin - The French AR Biplanes, Windsock International Vol 6 #5 (Sept-Oct 1990) & Vol 7 #1 (Jan-Feb 1991)

External links
For the photographs of the Dorands see following pages:
 http://jnpassieux.chez-alice.fr/html/DorandAR1.php
 A history of military equipment of Modern Greece (1821-today): Dorand A.R.1
 http://www.worldwar1.com/dbc/ar1and2.htm

1910s French military reconnaissance aircraft
Military aircraft of World War I
Biplanes with negative stagger
Single-engined tractor aircraft
Aircraft manufactured in France
Aircraft first flown in 1916